Lucy Sprague can refer to:

 Lucy J. Sprague, born Earle (1851–1903), American suffragist
 Lucy Sprague Mitchell (1878–1967), American educator